Nationality words link to articles with information on the nation's poetry or literature (for instance, Irish or France).

Events

 June 27 – Mary Robinson writes the poem January, 1795.
 August 21–September 26 – English poet William Wordsworth and his sister Dorothy stay at 7 Great George Street, Bristol, during which time they meet Samuel Taylor Coleridge, Robert Southey and the latter poets' publisher Joseph Cottle.
 October 4 – Coleridge marries Sara Fricker at St Mary Redcliffe, Bristol. On November 14, Southey marries Sara's sister Edith in the same church.

Works published

United Kingdom
 William Blake, Prophetic books:
 The Book of Ahania, illuminated book with five intaglio plates; one known copy
 The Book of Los, illuminated book with five intaglio plates
 The Song of Los, illuminated book with 8 plates, five known copies
 Samuel Taylor Coleridge, Sonnets on Eminent Characters, also known as Sonnets on Eminent Contemporaries, a series of 11 sonnets published in the Morning Chronicle from December 1, 1794 to January 29, this year; these three were published this year:
 To William Godwin, Author of Political Justice (William Godwin); published January 10
 To Robert Southey, of Baliol College, Oxford, Author of the 'Retrospect,' and Other Poems (Robert Southey); published January 14
 To Richard Brinsley Sheridan, Esq. (Richard Brinsley Sheridan); published January 29
 Joseph Cottle, published anonymously, Poems
 Ann Batten Cristall, Poetical Sketches
 William Drennan, Erin
 William Hayley, The National Advocates
 Walter Savage Landor:
 Published anonymously, Moral Epistle to Lord Stanhope
 The Poems of Walter Savage Landor, suppressed by the author
 Joseph Ritson, editor, Robin Hood: A Collection of all the Ancient Poems
 Robert Southey and Robert Lovell, Poems
 John Thelwall, Poems Written in Close Confinement in the Tower and Newgate, the author was arrested in 1794 and sent to the Tower of London

United States
 Philip Morin Freneau, Poems Written Between the Years 1768 and 1794, 287 poems, including previously unpublished work and revised poems (omitting Latin mottoes, for instance, in order to communicate better with a broader group of readers); he published the work on his own printing press, but although he and the booksellers had high hopes for it, the reception is poor
 Robert Treat Paine, Jr., "The Invention of Letters" commencement verse delivered at Harvard University; described the history of thought, eulogized Washington and attacked  Jacobins
 Isaac Story, Liberty
 Charles Pinkney Sumner, The Compass

Births
Death years link to the corresponding "[year] in poetry" article:
 August 7 – Joseph Rodman Drake (died 1820), American whose poetry is first published posthumously in 1835
 August 30 – Amable Tastu (Sabine Casimire Amable Voïart) (died 1885), French women of letters and poet
 September 15 – James Gates Percival (died 1856), American poet and geologist
 September 29 (September 18 O.S.) – Kondraty Ryleyev (hanged 1826), Russian poet and revolutionary
 October 12 – Janet Hamilton, née Thomson (died 1873), Scottish poet and essayist
 October 31 – John Keats (died 1821), English Romantic lyric poet
 December 4 – Thomas Carlyle (died 1881), Scottish satirical writer, essayist, historian, teacher and critic
 Also – George Darley (died 1846), Irish poet, novelist and critic

Deaths
Death years link to the corresponding "[year] in poetry" article:
 February 11 – Carl Michael Bellman (born 1740), Swedish poet and songwriter
 April 22 – Tadhg Gaelach Ó Súilleabháin (born 1715), Irish poet
 July 31 – Basílio da Gama, writing as Termindo Sipílio (born 1740), Brazilian Jesuit and epic poet
 November 17 – Samuel Bishop (born 1731), English poet, essayist and schoolmaster
 Also – Hedvig Sirenia (born 1734), Swedish poet

See also

Poetry

Notes

18th-century poetry
Poetry